Switzerland competed at the 1998 Winter Paralympics in Nagano, Japan. 19 competitors from Switzerland won 23 medals including 10 gold, 5 silver and 8 bronze and finished 6th in the medal table.

See also 
 Switzerland at the Paralympics
 Switzerland at the 1998 Winter Olympics

References 

1994
1998 in Swiss sport
Nations at the 1998 Winter Paralympics